The 1964 National Football League draft was held in Chicago, Illinois, at the Sheraton Hotel & Towers on Monday, December 2, 1963.

The first overall pick was Dave Parks, an end from Texas Tech, selected by the San Francisco 49ers.

The AFL draft was two days earlier, on Saturday, November 30. In the next two years, the drafts were held on the same day; following the merger agreement in June 1966, a common draft was instituted for 1967.

The 1964 NFL Draft is notable for the highest number of people enshrined in Pro Football Hall of Fame with 11 total, 1 player selected was inducted as a coach, Bill Parcells.

Player selections

Round one

 HOF Member of the Professional Football Hall of Fame

Round two

Round three

Round four

 3 Signed as a 1st round pick with the New York Jets of the American Football League.

Round five

Round six

Round seven

Round eight

Round nine

Round ten

Round eleven

Round twelve

Round thirteen

Round fourteen

Round fifteen

Round sixteen

Round seventeen

Round eighteen

Round nineteen

Round twenty

Hall of Famers
The 1964 NFL draft class has more Hall of Famers than any other class, with 11.

 Paul Warfield, halfback from Ohio State University Taken 1st round 11th overall by the Cleveland Browns.
Inducted: Professional Football Hall of Fame class of 1983.
 Charley Taylor, halfback from Arizona State University taken 1st round 3rd overall by the Washington Redskins.
Inducted: Professional Football Hall of Fame class of 1984.
 Roger Staubach, quarterback from Navy taken 10th round 129th overall by the Dallas Cowboys.
Inducted: Professional Football Hall of Fame class of 1985.
 Leroy Kelly, running back from  Morgan State taken 8th round 110th overall by the Cleveland Browns.
Inducted: Professional Football Hall of Fame class of 1994.
 Mel Renfro, cornerback from Oregon taken 2nd round 17th overall by the Dallas Cowboys.
Inducted: Professional Football Hall of Fame class of 1996.
 Paul Krause, safety from Iowa taken 2nd round 18th overall by the Washington Redskins.
Inducted: Professional Football Hall of Fame class of 1998.
 Dave Wilcox, linebacker from Oregon taken 3rd round 29th overall by the San Francisco 49ers.
Inducted: Professional Football Hall of Fame class of 2000.
 Bob Brown, offensive tackle from University of Nebraska–Lincoln taken 1st round 2nd overall by the Philadelphia Eagles.
Inducted: Professional Football Hall of Fame class of 2004.
 Carl Eller, defensive end from University of Minnesota taken 1st round 6th overall by the Minnesota Vikings.
Inducted: Professional Football Hall of Fame class of 2004.
 Bob Hayes, wide receiver from Florida A&M taken 7th round 88th overall by the Dallas Cowboys.
Inducted: Professional Football Hall of Fame class of 2009.
 Bill Parcells, offensive tackle from Wichita State University taken 7th round 89th overall by the Detroit Lions
Inducted: Professional Football Hall of Fame class of 2013 as a Head Coach.

Notable undrafted players

See also
 1964 American Football League Draft

References

External links
 NFL.com – 1964 Draft 
 databaseFootball.com – 1964 Draft
 Pro Football Hall of Fame

National Football League Draft
Draft
NFL Draft
NFL Draft
American football in Chicago
1960s in Chicago
Events in Chicago